Berezhnoy is a rural locality (a khutor) in Alexeyevsky District, Belgorod Oblast, Russia. The population was 10 as of 2010. There is 1 street.

Geography 
Berezhnoy is located 21 km southeast of Alexeyevka (the district's administrative centre) by road. Shkuropatov is the nearest rural locality.

References 

Rural localities in Alexeyevsky District, Belgorod Oblast
Biryuchensky Uyezd